FC Barcelona 6–1 Paris Saint-Germain F.C. was the result of the second leg of a UEFA Champions League tie which occurred on 8 March 2017 at the Camp Nou in Barcelona. FC Barcelona overcame a four-goal deficit in the second leg of their 2016–17 UEFA Champions League round of 16 tie against Paris Saint-Germain to win 6–5 on aggregate, making it the largest comeback in UEFA Champions League history, which became known in Spain and France as la Remontada (the comeback).

Background

History
It was the third time Paris Saint-Germain faced Barcelona in the UEFA Champions League knockout phases, having lost the two previous encounters in the 2012–13 and the 2014–15 seasons on aggregate.

Group stage
Both teams had comfortably qualified from the group stage. Paris Saint-Germain qualified as runner-up in Group A having faced Arsenal, Basel, and having achieved a 9-point lead over 3rd-placed Ludogorets Razgrad. Barcelona qualified as leaders of Group C, far in front of Borussia Mönchengladbach and Celtic and leading 2nd-place Manchester City by 6 points.

First leg

The first leg was played on 14 February at the Parc des Princes in Paris; both teams were in good shape with Paris Saint-Germain coming from a 3–0 away win at Bordeaux in Ligue 1 and Barcelona thrashing Deportivo Alavés in a 6–0 away win in La Liga.

Ángel Di María put the Parisians in front on 18 minutes with a free kick after Barcelona's Samuel Umtiti committed a foul. Julian Draxler made it 2–0 with a low shot in the 40th minute, assisted by Marco Verratti. After 55 minutes, Di María scored once again from a shot outside the box. Edinson Cavani scored the final goal of the game in the 72nd minute, securing the 4–0 win. Barcelona achieved only one shot on target during the whole match.

Match

Summary

The second leg was played on 8 March at the Camp Nou in Barcelona. Once again, the two teams came into the match having won their league games, Barcelona 5–0 vs. Celta Vigo and Paris Saint-Germain 1–0 against Nancy.

The game had an impressive attendance of 96,290 despite the home side's heavy defeat in the first game. Barcelona's Luis Suárez scored the first goal of the game in the 3rd minute after heading the ball over the line before it was cleared by Thomas Meunier. In the 40th minute, Paris Saint-Germain's Layvin Kurzawa scored an own goal in an attempt to block a shot by Andrés Iniesta. The third goal came in the 50th minute via a penalty scored by Lionel Messi after Neymar was fouled by Thomas Meunier. Barcelona's hopes were seemingly brought down after Edinson Cavani scored Paris Saint-Germain's only goal in the 62nd minute, leaving them requiring three more to win due to the away goals rule now favoring the away side, PSG. Then Barcelona’s Mascherano dragged down Di Maria in Barcelona’s penalty area but referee Deniz Aytekin did not blow for a penalty. Neymar scored two goals in the closing stages – a free kick in the 88th minute and a controversial penalty kick when Luis Suárez fell in the 90+1st – to make it 5–1. In the final seconds of the match, Neymar delivered a cross into the penalty area, and Sergi Roberto scored their sixth and final goal in the 90+5th minute, thus winning the game 6–1 and advancing to the quarter finals 6–5 on aggregate.

Details

Statistics

Post-match
In the aftermath of the tie, amid praise for Barcelona there was also criticism of Paris Saint-Germain for the manner in which they had failed to deal with the pressure of holding on to their aggregate lead, and speculation that the referee could be demoted from his status by the governing body due to some of the decisions he made during the match, particularly the award of Barcelona's second penalty. Subsequent analyses suggested that Paris Saint-Germain would have won the game had the VAR system been in use.

In the quarter-finals, Barcelona again suffered a heavy defeat in the first leg of the tie away from home, this time losing 3–0 to Juventus. However, they were unable to repeat their performance of the previous round and were eliminated after drawing 0–0 in the return leg.

One of the tie's main protagonists, Brazilian forward Neymar, was at the centre of a different matter involving the two clubs in August 2017 when he moved from Barcelona to Paris Saint-Germain for a world record transfer fee.

In October 2022, PSG’s striker Edinson Cavani declared to Spanish sports website Relevo that he was so affected by the defeat that he needed psychological therapy to overcome the shock.

In the round of 16 of the 2020–21 UEFA Champions League, Barcelona and Paris Saint-Germain once again faced off against each other, this time in different circumstances. A major talking point for the media was the return of Neymar to Barcelona, although he was ruled out of the first leg with an injury. Regardless, PSG won the match 4–1 at the Camp Nou, with a hat-trick from Kylian Mbappé. In the second leg, a still Neymar-less PSG side managed to hold on to a 1–1 draw, beating Barça 5–2 on aggregate and advancing to the quarter-finals.

Similar results in subsequent seasons
In the following season's competition, it was Barcelona who experienced an unexpected comeback defeat, losing 3–0 to Roma in Italy at the quarter-final stage and going out on away goals, despite having held a strong 4–1 advantage from the home leg of the tie.

In the 2018–19 UEFA Champions League round of 16, Paris Saint-Germain – without the injured Neymar – were the losing team in another significant comeback, as an under-strength Manchester United side won 3–1 at the Parc des Princes (the decisive goal from a penalty in added time awarded by VAR) having lost 2–0 at Old Trafford, the first time in the history of the competition that such a deficit from a home first leg had been overcome. In the semi-finals, Barcelona were eliminated after another second-leg collapse: holding a 3–0 advantage from the Camp Nou, they conceded four goals without reply to Liverpool at Anfield.

See also 
 Super Bowl LI, another large comeback in 2017
 1997 UEFA Cup Winners' Cup Final
 2016–17 FC Barcelona season
 2016–17 Paris Saint-Germain F.C. season
 FC Barcelona in international football
 Paris Saint-Germain F.C. in international football

References

External links
 UEFA match commentary

Barcelona 6-1 Paris Saint-Germain
Paris Saint-Germain 2017
Barcelona 2017
Barcelona 6-1 Paris Saint-Germain
March 2017 sports events in Spain
2010s in Barcelona
Barcelona 6-1 Paris Saint-Germain
Nicknamed sporting events